The Team free routine competition at the 2022 World Aquatics Championships will be held on 22 and 24 June 2022.

Results
The preliminary round was started on 22 June at 10:00. 
The final was held on 24 June at 16:00.

References

Team free routine